HMS Blake was a light cruiser of the  of the British Royal Navy, the last of the (traditional) Royal Navy gun-armed cruisers in the 20th century. She was named after Robert Blake, a 17th-century admiral who was the "Father of the Royal Navy". They had a low construction priority due to more pressing requirements for other ship types during World War II, particularly anti-submarine craft.

History

Construction and commissioning
Blake was laid down in 1942. In 1944, she was renamed Tiger, then Blake again in 1945, the year she was launched partially constructed at the Fairfield Shipbuilding and Engineering Company at Govan, by Lady Jean Blake, wife of Vice Admiral Sir Geoffrey Blake. Construction was suspended in 1946 and she was laid up at Gareloch.

In 1954, construction of Blake resumed, but to a new design. The new design was approved in 1951, but construction did not resume until 1954. She would have fully automatic 6 inch guns in twin high-angle mounts with each gun capable of shooting 20 rounds per minute, and a secondary battery of fully automatic 3 inch guns which delivered 90 rounds per minute per gun. She would have no lighter anti-aircraft armament or torpedo tubes. Air conditioning was fitted throughout the ship, and a 200-line automatic telephone exchange was installed. Each 6 inch and 3 inch mounting had its own director, linked to a dedicated radar on the director. On 18 March 1961, Blake finally commissioned into the Royal Navy, to date the last (traditional) cruiser to do so. Just two years later, she was placed in reserve.

Conversion
From 1965 to 1969, she underwent a major conversion to become a helicopter and command cruiser. This reconstruction included replacing the aft 6 inch and 3-inch mounts with a flight deck and hangar. She also had new radars and taller funnels. She had excellent command, control, and communications facilities installed, and found use as a flagship to task groups. The refit was very expensive; during the conversion, a major fire broke out causing considerable damage and raising the costs still further. There were concerns that the money used to convert Blake and her sister ship  to helicopter cruisers drained much-needed resources better used elsewhere.

Later career

In 1969 Blake deployed to Gibraltar along with other Royal Navy units in order to ‘fly the flag’ in response to Spanish hostility following the closure of the Gibraltar-Spain border by General Franco. Also in 1969 a Royal Air Force (RAF) Harrier jet landed on Blake. In 1971, she was present during the emotional withdrawal from Malta, supporting the commando carrier . In 1977 she took part in the Fleet Review of the Royal Navy during the Silver Jubilee celebrations for Queen Elizabeth II, which took place off Spithead, site of many Fleet Reviews.

The cruiser was host to the Westland Wessex HAS.3 helicopters of 820 Naval Air Squadron from June 1969 and these were replaced by the Westland Sea King HAS.1 helicopter in December 1972, continuing until Blake was withdrawn from service in 1979, when the ship became the last in the Royal Navy to fire a six-inch gun. Her large crew made her an expensive ship to operate and maintain.

Decommissioning
Blake was refitted in 1980, and due to a defence manpower drawdown that resulted in manpower shortages, became part of the Standby Squadron in HMNB Chatham. The advent of the Falklands War led to a rapid ship survey in early April 1982 and work was immediately begun to recommission her and sister ship Tiger for service in the conflict, but work was stopped on both in late May when it was clear neither could be ready in time to be deployed. Chile showed some interest in acquiring both her, and Tiger in June–July, but a proposed deal did not go through for the ships, despite both being in good shape and that a good deal of reactivation work had been accomplished the past April–May. She was sold for scrap on 25 August 1982 to Shipbreaking (Queenborough) Ltd for £210,000.  She was the last cruiser serving with the Royal Navy upon her decommissioning.  On 29 October 1982, she was towed from Chatham for Cairnryan, near Stranraer in Scotland, arriving 7 November 1982.

The 1961-1963 ship's bell of Blake has been preserved and was on display in Saint Mary's Church, Bridgwater, until 2016. Following the reordering of the church it was transferred to Blake Museum, Bridgwater where it forms part of the display about Robert Blake.

Commanding officers

References

Sources

Robert Gardiner, ed., Conway’s All the World’s Fighting Ships 1922 - 1946 (Conway Maritime Press, London, 1980)
Robert Gardiner, ed., Conway's All the World's Fighting Ships 1947 - 1982 (Conway Maritime Press, London, 1983)
Jane's Fighting Ships 1950-51 (Janes Publishing, London, 1950)
Alan Raven and John Roberts, British Cruisers of World War II, (Arms and Armour Press, London, 1980)
Sturtivant, Ray and Ballance, Theo, The Squadrons of the Fleet Air Arm, 1994, Air-Britain (Historians) Ltd, Tonbridge, Kent, 
M. J. Whitley, Cruisers of World War Two: An Illustrated Encyclopedia (Arms and Armour Press, London, 1995)
HMS Blake at Uboat.net
A history of the Tiger class

Tiger-class cruisers
Helicopter carriers
Ships built in Govan
1945 ships
Cold War cruisers of the United Kingdom